Erik Mathiassen Enge (3 March 1852 – 26 October 1933) was a Norwegian politician for the Free-minded Liberal Party and later the Agrarian Party. He served as Minister of Agriculture from 1912 to 1913. From 1927 to 1930, he was the leader of the Agrarian Party. Enge was a farmer by profession.

References

1852 births
1933 deaths
Government ministers of Norway
Ministers of Agriculture and Food of Norway